The 2023 Championship League Invitational was a professional non-ranking snooker tournament, which took place from 19 December 2022 to 2 March 2023 at the Morningside Arena in Leicester, England.

John Higgins defended his title, winning the tournament for the fourth time after beating Judd Trump 3–1 in the final.

Prize fund 
The breakdown of prize money for the 2023 Championship League is shown below.

Groups 1–7
Winner: £3,000
Runner-up: £2,000
Semi-final: £1,000
Frame-win (league stage): £100
Frame-win (play-offs): £300
Highest break: £500

Winners' Group
Winner: £10,000
Runner-up: £5,000
Semi-final: £3,000
Frame-win (league stage): £200
Frame-win (play-offs): £300
Highest break: £1,000

Tournament total: £184,200

Group 1 
Group 1 was played on 19 and 20 December 2022. Jack Lisowski won the group and qualified for the Winners' Group.

Matches 

 Jack Lisowski 3–1 Jimmy Robertson
 Ryan Day 3–2 Jordan Brown
 Jack Lisowski 3–1 Ali Carter
 Stuart Bingham 2–3 Matthew Selt
 Jimmy Robertson 1–3 Ryan Day
 Ali Carter 0–3 Matthew Selt
 Jack Lisowski 1–3 Ryan Day
 Jordan Brown 3–1 Stuart Bingham
 Ryan Day 3–2 Ali Carter
 Jimmy Robertson 2–3 Jordan Brown
 Ali Carter 3–0 Stuart Bingham
 Jack Lisowski 3–0 Matthew Selt
 Jordan Brown 1–3 Matthew Selt
 Jimmy Robertson 2–3 Stuart Bingham
 Jordan Brown 3–2 Ali Carter
 Stuart Bingham 3–1 Ryan Day
 Jimmy Robertson 1–3 Ali Carter
 Ryan Day 3–2 Matthew Selt
 Jack Lisowski 1–3 Stuart Bingham
 Jimmy Robertson 3–1 Matthew Selt
 Jack Lisowski 1–3 Jordan Brown

Table

Play-offs

Group 2 
Group 2 was played on 21 and 22 December 2022. Stuart Bingham won the group and qualified for the Winners' Group.

Matches 

 Barry Hawkins 1–3 Ryan Day
 Jamie Jones 3–1 Stuart Bingham
 Barry Hawkins 0–3 Jordan Brown
 Robert Milkins 3–2 Matthew Selt
 Ryan Day 3–0 Jamie Jones
 Jordan Brown 0–3 Matthew Selt
 Barry Hawkins 3–0 Jamie Jones
 Stuart Bingham 1–3 Robert Milkins
 Jamie Jones 0–3 Jordan Brown
 Stuart Bingham 3–2 Ryan Day
 Jordan Brown 3–1 Robert Milkins
 Barry Hawkins 1–3 Matthew Selt
 Stuart Bingham 0–3 Matthew Selt
 Ryan Day 2–3 Robert Milkins
 Stuart Bingham 3–1 Jordan Brown
 Barry Hawkins 2–3 Robert Milkins
 Ryan Day 1–3 Jordan Brown
 Jamie Jones 3–2 Matthew Selt
 Robert Milkins 2–3 Jamie Jones
 Barry Hawkins 1–3 Stuart Bingham
 Ryan Day 0–3 Matthew Selt

Table

Play-offs

Group 3 
Group 3 was played on 3 and 4 January 2023. Kyren Wilson won the group and qualified for the Winners' Group.

Matches 

 Mark Selby 2−3 Matthew Selt
 Ricky Walden 3−1 Jamie Jones
 Mark Selby 3−1 Jordan Brown
 Kyren Wilson 3−1 Robert Milkins
 Ricky Walden 3−1 Matthew Selt
 Jordan Brown 1−3 Robert Milkins
 Mark Selby 3−1 Ricky Walden
 Kyren Wilson 3−1 Jamie Jones
 Ricky Walden 3−2 Jordan Brown
 Matthew Selt 3−2 Jamie Jones
 Kyren Wilson 2−3 Jordan Brown
 Mark Selby 3−2 Robert Milkins
 Kyren Wilson 3−1 Matthew Selt
 Jamie Jones 0−3 Robert Milkins
 Kyren Wilson 0−3 Ricky Walden
 Jordan Brown 1−3 Jamie Jones
 Ricky Walden 3−1 Robert Milkins
 Jordan Brown 3−0 Matthew Selt
 Mark Selby 2−3 Kyren Wilson
 Mark Selby 1−3 Jamie Jones
 Matthew Selt 3−1 Robert Milkins

Table

Play-offs

Group 4 
Group 4 was played on 5 and 6 January 2023. Zhao Xintong was due to enter the event in this group, but was withdrawn after being suspended by the WPBSA, and was replaced by Gary Wilson. Judd Trump won the group and qualified for the Winners' Group.

Matches 

 Judd Trump 3−0 Ricky Walden
 Gary Wilson 2−3 Robert Milkins
 Judd Trump 3−0 Mark Selby
 John Higgins 3−1 Matthew Selt
 Gary Wilson 3−2 Ricky Walden
 Mark Selby 3−0 Matthew Selt
 Judd Trump 3−1 Gary Wilson
 John Higgins 3−2 Robert Milkins
 Mark Selby 3−1 Gary Wilson
 Ricky Walden 2−3 Robert Milkins
 Mark Selby 1−3 John Higgins
 Judd Trump 1−3 Matthew Selt
 John Higgins 1−3 Ricky Walden
 Robert Milkins 0−3 Matthew Selt
 John Higgins 3 −0 Gary Wilson
 Mark Selby 1−3 Robert Milkins
 Gary Wilson 2−3 Matthew Selt
 Mark Selby 3−1 Ricky Walden
 Judd Trump 2−3 John Higgins
 Judd Trump 3−0 Robert Milkins
 Ricky Walden 3−0 Matthew Selt

Table

Play-offs

Group 5 
Group 5 was played on 7 and 8 February 2023. Mark Selby withdrew from the tournament prior to group 5 play. Mark Williams was due to enter the event in this group, but also withdrew. The two players were replaced by Xiao Guodong and Noppon Saengkham. John Higgins won the group and qualified for the Winners' Group.

Matches 

 Neil Robertson 3–0 Robert Milkins
 Davild Gilbert 0–3 Matthew Selt
 Neil Robertson 1–3 Xiao Guodong
 Noppon Saengkham 2–3 John Higgins
 David Gilbert 2–3 Robert Milkins
 Xiao Guodong 3–1 John Higgins
 Neil Robertson 3–0 David Gilbert
 Noppon Saengkham 1–3 Matthew Selt
 David Gilbert 3–2 Xiao Guodong
 Robert Milkins 0–3 Matthew Selt
 Noppon Saengkham 2–3 Xiao Guodong
 Neil Robertson 3–2 John Higgins
 Noppon Saengkham 0–3 Robert Milkins
 John Higgins 3–1 Matthew Selt
 Noppon Saengkham 3–1 David Gilbert
 Xiao Guodong 3 –0  Matthew Selt
 David Gilbert 3–1 John Higgins
 Xiao Guodong 1–3 Robert Milkins
 Neil Robertson 2–3 Matthew Selt
 Neil Robertson 1–3 Noppon Saengkham
 John Higgins 3–2 Robert Milkins

Table

Play-offs

Group 6 
Group 6 was played on 9 and 10 February 2023. Luca Brecel was due to enter the event in this group but withdrew, and was replaced by Joe Perry. Neil Robertson won the group and qualified for the Winners' Group.

Matches 

 Anthony McGill 3–0 Neil Robertson
 Zhou Yuelong 3–2 Xiao Guodong
 Joe Perry 0–3 Matthew Selt
 Anthony McGill 1–3 Xiao Guodong
 Zhou Yuelong 3–2 Robert Milkins
 Xiao Guodong 1–3 Matthew Selt
 Anthony McGill 3–0 Zhou Yuelong
 Joe Perry 3–2 Robert Milkins
 Anthony McGill 2–3 Matthew Selt
 Neil Robertson 2–3 Robert Milkins
 Joe Perry 0–3 Xiao Guodong
 Zhou Yuelong 3–2 Neil Robertson
 Joe Perry 2–3 Neil Robertson
 Robert Milkins 1–3 Matthew Selt
 Joe Perry 2–3 Zhou Yuelong
 Xiao Guodong 3–2 Robert Milkins
 Zhou Yuelong 0–3 Matthew Selt
 Xiao Guodong 2–3 Neil Robertson
 Anthony McGill 1–3 Joe Perry
 Anthony McGill 2–3 Robert Milkins
 Neil Robertson 3–1 Matthew Selt

Table

Play-offs

Group 7 
Group 7 was played on 27 and 28 February 2023. Robert Milkins withdrew from the tournament prior to group 7 play. Ronnie O'Sullivan and Shaun Murphy were due to enter the event in this group, but both withdrew.  The three players were replaced by Lyu Haotian, Stephen Maguire and Graeme Dott. Xiao Guodong won the group and qualified for the Winners' Group.

Matches 

 Lyu Haotian 3–0 Matthew Selt
 Stephen Maguire 2–3 Graeme Dott
 Lyu Haotian 1–3 Xiao Guodong
 Tom Ford 3–1 Zhou Yuelong
 Stephen Maguire 3–1 Matthew Selt
 Xiao Guodong 2–3 Zhou Yuelong
 Lyu Haotian 1–3 Stephen Maguire
 Tom Ford 2–3 Graeme Dott
 Stephen Maguire 3–1 Xiao Guodong
 Matthew Selt 0–3 Graeme Dott
 Tom Ford 2–3 Xiao Guodong
 Lyu Haotian 3–2 Zhou Yuelong
 Tom Ford 0–3 Matthew Selt
 Graeme Dott 3–2 Zhou Yuelong
 Tom Ford 3–2 Stephen Maguire
 Xiao Guodong 1–3 Graeme Dott
 Stephen Maguire 3–1 Zhou Yuelong
 Xiao Guodong 3–1 Matthew Selt
 Lyu Haotian 3–1 Tom Ford
 Lyu Haotian 3–1 Graeme Dott
 Matthew Selt 0–3 Zhou Yuelong

Table

Play-offs

Winners' Group 
The Winners' Group was played on 1 and 2 March 2023. John Higgins won the Championship League for a fourth time, beating Judd Trump 3–1 in the final.

Matches 

 Neil Robertson 2–3 Stuart Bingham
 John Higgins 0–3 Kyren Wilson
 Neil Robertson 3–1 Jack Lisowski
 Judd Trump 3–1 Xiao Guodong
 John Higgins 3–2 Stuart Bingham
 Jack Lisowski 3–1 Xiao Guodong
 Neil Robertson 3–2 John Higgins
 Judd Trump 3–1 Kyren Wilson
 John Higgins 3–1 Jack Lisowski
 Kyren Wilson 3–1 Stuart Bingham
 Judd Trump 3–1 Jack Lisowski
 Neil Robertson 0–3 Xiao Guodong
 Judd Trump 3–1 Stuart Bingham
 Kyren Wilson 3–1 Xiao Guodong
 Judd Trump 2–3 John Higgins
 Kyren Wilson 3–2 Jack Lisowski
 John Higgins 3–1 Xiao Guodong
 Jack Lisowski 3–1 Stuart Bingham
 Neil Robertson 0–3 Judd Trump
 Neil Robertson 3–2 Kyren Wilson
 Stuart Bingham 3–2 Xiao Guodong

Table

Play-offs

Century breaks 
A total of 159 century breaks were made during the tournament.

 144 (W), 141 (4), 141, 137, 135, 126, 121, 116, 115, 108, 107, 102, 100, 100  John Higgins
 143 (5), 139, 130, 122, 118, 114, 111, 108, 107, 101  Neil Robertson
 143 (5), 109, 103, 100, 100  Robert Milkins
 143 (1), 105, 100  Jimmy Robertson
 142 (2), 140, 139, 138, 132, 130, 120, 118, 112, 109, 108, 104, 103, 100  Stuart Bingham
 142, 135, 119, 115, 111, 101  Jack Lisowski
 141, 138 (6), 138, 133, 130, 128, 127, 127, 127, 126, 123, 117, 111, 110, 110, 108, 107, 106, 106, 103, 102, 101, 101  Matthew Selt
 140 (7), 106  Graeme Dott
 138, 134, 131, 124  Gary Wilson
 137, 133 (3), 129, 112, 105, 104, 104, 103, 101  Kyren Wilson
 137, 114  Ali Carter
 136, 132, 112  Jordan Brown
 136, 122  Tom Ford
 135, 119, 103  Noppon Saengkham
 135, 115  David Gilbert
 134, 108  Joe Perry
 131, 131, 124, 122, 118, 117, 113, 112, 111, 111, 110, 110, 109, 106, 105, 102  Xiao Guodong
 130, 112, 107, 107, 104  Ricky Walden
 130, 128, 116, 106, 100, 100  Lyu Haotian
 129, 122, 116, 108, 108, 108, 104, 102, 100, 100  Judd Trump
 128, 120, 117  Jamie Jones
 124, 121, 118  Mark Selby
 124  Stephen Maguire
 123, 112  Anthony McGill
 118, 113, 109  Zhou Yuelong
 115, 105, 105, 100, 100, 100  Ryan Day

Bold: highest break in the indicated group.

Winnings 

Green: Won the group. Bold: Highest break in the group. All prize money in GBP.
Parenthesis: Ranking prior to tournament start, 19 December 2022.
Notes
(a) Mark Selby withdrew from the tournament prior to group 5 play.
(b) Robert Milkins withdrew from the tournament prior to group 7 play.

References 

2022–23
2023 in snooker
2023 in English sport
December 2022 sports events in the United Kingdom
January 2023 sports events in the United Kingdom
February 2023 sports events in the United Kingdom
March 2023 sports events in the United Kingdom
2022–23 Championship League